The Syro-Malabar Church is a Catholic Church sui iuris of the East Syriac Rite that adheres to the following calendar for the church's liturgical year. Like other liturgical calendars, the Syro-Malabar calendar loosely follows the sequence of pivotal events in the life of Jesus.

Liturgical seasons  
The Syro-Malabar liturgical year opens with the season of Annunciation, which begins on the Sunday between November 27 and December 3. This day corresponds to the First Sunday of Advent in the Western Roman Rite tradition.

The liturgical year is divided into the following nine seasons.

Although the eighth season (Elijah–Cross–Moses) is considered one of the nine, it is also regarded as a combination of the three distinct seasons that are named (Elijah, Cross, and Moses).

Holy days of obligation 

In the Syro-Malabar Church, there are 6 holy days of obligation:

 Epiphany (January 6)
 Sts. Peter and Paul (June 29)
 The Ascension of Our Lord (sixth Thursday after Easter)
 St. Thomas (July 3)
 The Assumption of the Blessed Virgin Mary (August 15)
 Christmas (December 25)

Periods of fasting 

The Syro-Malabar Church proposes the following days of fasting to the faithful:

See also 
 Saint Thomas Christians
 Knanaya
 Syro-Malankara Catholic Church

References

Notes

External links 
 Syro-Malabar Commission for Liturgy
www.christianhomily.com Sunday and Feast Homily Resources in English and Homily Videos in Malayalam by Fr. Abraham Mutholath according to the Syro-Malabar Calendar Set one and two.
Homily Videos in Malayalam by Fr. Abraham Mutholath
www.bibleinterpretation.org Bible Interpretation by Rev. Abraham Mutholath in English.
www.biblereflection.org Bible Interpretation with reflection by Rev. Abraham Mutholath in English.

 Official calendars: 2021, 2020, 2019, 2018, 2017, 2016, 2015, 2014, 2013

Syro-Malabar Catholic Church
Liturgical calendars of the Catholic Church
Time in India